Petra Hartmann (born 1970 in Hildesheim) is a German novelist, journalist and author.

Life
Petra Hartmann grew up in Sillium, a little village near Hildesheim. She visited a humanistic secondary school in Hildesheim and studied German language and literature, philosophy and politics at the University of Hannover. Than she made her doctors degree with a thesis about the young German author Theodor Mundt.
During her studying time she worked as a freelance journalist for several newspapers in Lower Saxony and Bremerhaven. After a two years traineeship she became an editor at a daily newspaper in Springe, where she was working for five years. Now she is a freelance author and journalist.

Writing
Petra Hartmann is writing fantasy and fairytales. She won the bronze-medaille of the Storyolympiade three times (1999, 2000 and 2001). In 2008 she won the German Phantastik Price.
She published three novels, which were playing in the fantasy-world Movenna. Her main publisher is Wurdack Publishing. For this publisher she was editor of two anthologies of fairytales, too. Furthermore, she wrote novellas for Arcanum Publishing.
As a literature scientist her focus is on Young Germany (especially Theodor Mundt, Gustav Kühne and Charlotte Stieglitz). She published also essays about Uwe Johnson, about adaptions of the Faust- and Don Juan-theme, about thematic motifs of fantasy and journalistic writing

Selected works

Books
 Faust und Don Juan. Ein Verschmelzungsprozeß, dargestellt anhand der Autoren Wolfgang Amadeus Mozart, Johann Wolfgang von Goethe, Nikolaus Lenau, Christian Dietrich Grabbe, Gustav Kühne und Theodor Mundt. Stuttgart: ibidem Publishing, 1998. 
 Von Zukunft trunken und keiner Gegenwart voll. Theodor Mundts literarische Entwicklung vom Buch der Bewegung zum historischen Roman. Dissertation. Bielefeld: Aisthesis, 2003. 
 Geschichten aus Movenna. Nittendorf: Wurdack Publishing, 2004. 
 Ein Prinz für Movenna. Nittendorf: Wurdack, 2007. 
 Zwischen Barrikade, Burgtheater und Beamtenpension. Die jungdeutschen Autoren nach 1835. Stuttgart: ibidem, 2009. 
 Darthula, Tochter der Nebel. Dortmund: Arcanum-Fantasy-Publishing, 2010. 
 Der Fels der schwarzen Götter. Nittendorf: Wurdack, 2010. 
 Die letzte Falkin. Dortmund: Arcanum-Fantasy-Publishing, 2010. 
 Die Schlagzeile. Munic: PersonalNovel, 2011.
 Das Serum des Doctor Nikola. Nittendorf: Wurdack, 2013. 
 Nestis und die verschwundene Seepocke. Hildesheim: Verlag Monika Fuchs, 2013. 
 Nestis und die Hafenpiraten. Hildesheim:  Verlag Monika Fuchs, 2014. .
 Hut ab, Hödeken! Sagen aus dem Hildesheimer Land. Verlag Monika Fuchs, Hildesheim 2015, .
 Freiheitsschwingen. PersonalNovel, München 2015.
 Timur. Saphir im Stahl, Bickenbach 2015, .
 Vom Feuervogel. TES, Erfurt 2015.
 Berthold von Holle: Crane. Ein Ritter-Epos, nacherzählt von Petra Hartmann. Verlag Monika Fuchs, Hildesheim 2016. ISBN 978-3-940078-48-3.
 Berthold von Holle: Demantin. Ein Ritter-Epos, nacherzählt von Petra Hartmann. Verlag Monika Fuchs, Hildesheim 2016. ISBN 978-3-940078-34-6.
 Nestis und die verbotene Welle. Verlag Monika Fuchs, Hildesheim, 2017. ISBN 978-3-947066-00-1
 Nestis und der Weihnachtssand. Verlag Monika Fuchs, Hildesheim, 2017. ISBN 978-3-947066-12-4
 Falkenblut. Hottenstein Verlag, Sibbesse, 2020. ISBN 978-3935928991

E-books
 Falkenfrühling. Dortmund: Arcanum, 2011. 
 Die Schlagzeile. Munic: PersonalNovel, 2012
 Falkenblut. Saarbrücken: satzweiss.com - chichili agency, 2012. , 
 Nestis und der Weihnachtssand. Ein Helgoland-Märchen. Hildesheim: Verlag Monika Fuchs, 2013. 
 Beim Vorderhuf meines Pferdes. Neue Geschichten aus Movenna. Nittendorf: Wurdack-Verlag, 2014.

Audiobooks
 Weihnachten im Schneeland. Essen: Action Publishing, 2010.
 Der Fels der schwarzen Götter. Essen: Action-Publishing, 2012.
 Hut ab, Hödeken! Sagen aus dem Hildesheimer Land. Verlag Monika Fuchs, Hildesheim 2016.

Editorship
 Drachenstarker Feenzauber. Nittendorf: Wurdack, 2007. 
 Wovon träumt der Mond?. Nittendorf: Wurdack, 2008. 
 Drachen! Drachen! Fiese Essenzen aus dreiundzwanzig Genres. Blitz Publishing, 2012. 
 Mit Klinge und Feder. Homburg/Saar: Ulrich Burger Publishing, 2013. 
 Autorenträume. Ein Lesebuch. Hildesheim: Monika Fuchs Publishing, 2013. 
 Blitzeis und Gänsebraten. Hildesheimer Weihnachtsgeschichten. Hildesheim: Monika Fuchs, 2014.

References

External link
Personal website (German)

1970 births
Living people
German writers
German women writers
People from Hildesheim